Ndifreke Udo Effiong  (born 15 August 1998) is a Nigerian footballer who plays for Ahli Benghazi In Libya.

International
He has represented Nigeria at the 2015 African Games, 2015 Africa U-23 Cup of Nations and the 2016 Summer Olympics. He made his debut for the Nigeria national football team on 26 March 2019 in a friendly against Egypt, as a 90th-minute substitute for Shehu Abdullahi.

Honours
Nigeria U23
 Olympic Bronze Medal: 2016

References

External links

1998 births
Living people
Nigerian footballers
Nigeria international footballers
Footballers at the 2016 Summer Olympics
Olympic footballers of Nigeria
Medalists at the 2016 Summer Olympics
Olympic bronze medalists for Nigeria
Olympic medalists in football
Nigeria Professional Football League players
Association football defenders
African Games bronze medalists for Nigeria
African Games medalists in football
Competitors at the 2015 African Games
Abia Warriors F.C. players